Healthcare in Serbia is delivered by means of a universal health care system.

Current system
The healthcare system is managed by the National Health Insurance Fund (RFZO), which covers all citizens and permanent residents. All employees, self-employed persons, and pensioners must pay contributions to it. Contributions are based on a sliding scale, with wealthier members of society paying higher percentages of their income. Despite this, corruption still remains a serious problem due to low salaries, with many doctors demanding bribes in exchange for better treatment, although there is a major campaign against corruption from the government and NGOs.

As of 2014, the expenditure on health care in Serbia was 10.37% of GDP in 2014, US$1,312 per capita. Also, as of 2014, Serbia had 308 doctors per 100,000 people (360 per 100,000 people was European Union (EU) average), 628 non-doctoral medical staff per 100,000 people (1,199 per 100,000 people was EU average). Although there is a trend of decreasing number of hospital beds per 100,000 people in Europe due to better efficiency and diagnostics, Serbia is among  countries in Europe with 552 hospital beds per 100,000 people. In terms of the availability of medical equipment, Serbia is slightly trailing behind the average of EU countries.

The Government of Serbia is working with the World Bank in improving the quality and efficiency of Serbia's healthcare system.

Changes in the Healthcare system

In the past few decades, there have been numerous changes in the healthcare system that were set up when Serbia was a part of SFR Yugoslavia. During those years, healthcare was free but practically unavailable to all people, there were no fixed prices, and services were often abused. Today, reforms have mandated but failed to implement a basic level of health services for all people, but at varying levels or co-payment. Services not covered may be supplemented by private insurance. Current concerns in the field of Serbian healthcare, as reported by the medical staff providing care, are poor funding for primary care, inadequate equipment and supplies, inadequate salaries, and inadequate continuing medical education. Overall, the recent healthcare reforms have tried to change the emphasis from curative to preventive care.

In 2014, the Chairperson of "Doctors Against Corruption" has been appointed a Special Adviser to the Ministry of Health.

There was publication of List of Licensed Medical Practitioners In October 2015 on the Serbian Medical Chamber's website which wasn't previously accessible to the citizens

Legislation
The Health Protection Act and the Health Insurance Act came into force on 11 April 2019. There is a list of health institutions that cannot be privately owned:
 emergency medical assistance, 
 provision of blood and blood products, 
 harvesting, preservation and transplantation of human organs and parts of human bodies, 
 production of serums and vaccines,
 pathoanatomy and autopsy
 forensic medicine service

A Register of Health Institutions is to be established by the Agency for Business Registers of Serbia by 11 October 2020. A common waiting list system is to be established.

Patients are obliged to submit to targeted preventive examinations. If they fail to undergo a mandatory screening without justification they have to contribute a maximum 35% of the total cost of health services if they are diagnosed before the next screening cycle begins.

Gifts worth more than 5% of the average monthly net salary in Serbia to health professionals are outlawed.

Culture of healthcare in Serbia
Self care is mainly practiced when a patient is already ill versus as a preventive measure. Care is usually sought from healthcare professionals such as doctors or nurses where bribes are commonly expected, but some folk medications are used such as teas, vinegar, herbs, and vitamins. Changes in activity levels such as more rest or increased exercise are sometimes used as curative measures for illness, and perceived causes of illness may be improper diet or fate. Hjelm, Bard, Nyberg, and Apelqvist (2005) state that most former Yugoslavians feel health is not the absence of disease, but rather it is “wealth and the most important thing in life…to have enough strength” (p. 51).

See also
 Health in Serbia
 List of hospitals in Serbia

References

Further reading
 Nelson, B.D., Simic, S., Beste, L., Vukovic, D., Bjegovic,V., & VanRooyen, M.J. (2003). Multimodal assessment of the primary healthcare system of Serbia: A model for evaluating post conflict health systems. Prehospital and Disaster Medicine, 18(1), 6-13
 Hjelm, K., Nyberg, P., Isacsson, A., & Apelqvist, J. (1999). Beliefs about health and illness essential for self-care practice: a comparison of migrant Yugoslavian and Swedish diabetic females. Journal of Advanced Nursing, 30(5), 1147–1159.
 Hjelm, K.G., Bard, K., Nyberg, P, & Apelqvist, J. (2005). Beliefs about health and diabetes in men of different ethnic origin. Journal of Advanced Nursing, 50(1), 47–59.
 McCathy, M. (2007). Serbia rebuilds and reforms its health-care system. Lancet, 369, 360.
 Kunitz, S.J. (2004). The making and breaking of Yugoslavia and its impact on health. American Journal of Public Health, 94(11), 1894–1904.
 Vlajinac, H., Marinkovik, J., Kocev, N., Sipetic, S., Bjegovic, V., Jankovic, S.,...Maksimivic, J. (2008). Years of life lost due to premature death in Serbia (excluding Kosovo and Metohia). Journal of the Royal Institute of Public Health, 122, 277–284.

External links
 Ministry of Health of Serbia